The 1994–95 Courage League National Division Two  was the eighth full season of rugby union within the second tier of the English league system, currently known as the RFU Championship. Joining the six teams who participated in 1993–94 were London Irish and Newcastle Gosforth, both relegated from Division One, and Coventry and Fylde who were both promoted from the third tier.

Saracens, the first team to be champions twice, were promoted to the Courage League National Division One for season 1995–96. There was no promotion for the runners–up Wakefield who finished in their highest league position. Coventry finished last and were relegated to Courage League National Division Three for season 1995–96 as were Fylde who finish one place above them. Both teams had been promoted in 1992–93.

Participating teams

Table

Sponsorship
National Division Two is part of the Courage Clubs Championship and is sponsored by Courage Brewery

See also
 English rugby union system

References

N2
RFU Championship seasons